Rondout School District 72 is a K-8 one school district located in Rondout, Illinois, an unincorporated community in Libertyville Township, Lake County, Illinois. The  district serves students from the surrounding communities of Green Oaks, Lake Bluff, Mettawa, and unincorporated Lake Forest. Approximately 161 students are currently enrolled in the district. The district's one school, aptly known as Rondout Elementary School and the district as a whole are headed by Dr. Jenny Wojcik, the superintendent. The district is located in a low-density residential area/business and industrial complex, explaining the somewhat small student body. The district is serviced by the Cook Memorial Public Library District. Rondout was recognized in the year 2010 as an Illinois State school of Character (one of three in Illinois) for its work in promoting social emotional learning and character development.

History

The district's sole school building was constructed in the late 19th-century to educate the children of the farm families that inhabited Lake County at the time; when the surrounding regions industrialized, the student body reached District 72's maximum capacity; in 1917, and a new building was constructed on Bradley Road to accommodate the new students. Since 1917, several other additions expanded  the district's facilities. The most recent addition was completed in 2009.

External links
School District Website

References

Lake Forest, Illinois

School districts in Lake County, Illinois